Ana Maria Braga Maffeis (born 1 April 1949) is a Brazilian television presenter and journalist.

Early life and education 
Braga was born on April 1, 1949, the daughter of the Italian Natale Giuseppe Maffeis and the Brazilian Lourdes Braga. She graduated with degrees in biology and zoology at the São Paulo State University in São José do Rio Preto. She also holds Italian citizenship through her father.

Career 
Braga started her career in journalism working on the news program Rede Tupi de Notícias at Rede Tupi. She later worked at Editora Abril as a commercial director for fashion magazines such as Cláudia. She attained national recognition at Rede Record, where she presented the morning show Note e Anote and the talk show Programa Ana Maria Braga.

Since 1999, she has presented the variety program Mais Você at Rede Globo, which was co-hosted with a parrot puppet named Louro José until the death of his puppeteer Tom Veiga on November 1, 2020.

Personal life 
In 2020, she married the French businessman Johnny Lucet in her own home of São Paulo.

Filmography

Television 
 Presenter
 1977-1980 Rede Tupi de Notícias (Rede Tupi)
 1993-1999 Note e Anote (Rede Record)
 1996-1999 Programa Ana Maria Braga (Rede Record)
 1999-current Mais Você (Rede Globo)
 Special participations
 2000 - Você Decide - (Ep: "Olha o Passarinho")
 2002 - O Clone - herself
 2002 - A Grande Família -herself (Ep: "A quentinha de Bebel")
 2002 - Sítio do Picapau Amarelo -herself (Eps: "A pedra mágica de Tupã" e "O Sumiço da Emília")
 2004 - A Diarista -herself(Ep: "Aquele do Projac")
 2004 - Sob Nova Direção - herself (Ep: "Axé do Dengo)
 2008 - Beleza Pura -herself (tho chapters)
 2010 - Junto e Misturado -herself (Ep: "celebridades bloco 2")
 2010 - Passione - herself
 2011 - Malhação Conectados - herself
 2012 - Louco por Elas - herself
 2012 - Cheias de Charme - herself (two chapters)
 2013 - Sangue Bom - herself
 2014 - Alto Astral - herself

Cinema 
 2001 - Xuxa e os Duendes - Zinga
 2002 - Xuxa e os Duendes 2 - No Caminho das Fadas - Zinga
 2013 - As Aventuras de Crô - herself

Recordings 
 Solo
 2003: Sou Eu
 Special guest
 2005: "Na Trilha do Amor" on  Fábio Júnior's Mais de 20 e Poucos Anos

Books 
 2009: Mais Você 10 Anos
 2010: À Espera dos Filhos da Luz - fiction
 2011: Dicas de Quase Tudo
 2011: Chef em Casa
 2011:  Mais Você: Viagens e Receitas Internacionais
 2012: A Cozinha Rápida

References

External links 

Official website (in Portuguese)

1949 births
Living people
Brazilian people of Italian descent
Brazilian people of Portuguese descent
Brazilian television presenters
Brazilian journalists
Brazilian women journalists
Brazilian television actresses
Brazilian film actresses
Brazilian women television presenters
São Paulo State University alumni
Citizens of Italy through descent
People from São Joaquim da Barra
20th-century Brazilian women
21st-century Brazilian women